Rozalind MacPhail is a Canadian singer-songwriter and multi-instrumentalist.

Biography
Rozalind MacPhail was born in Toronto, Ontario, Canada and grew up on Toronto Island. At the age of thirteen, she adopted the flute after her grandmother read an article on the instrument's positive effects for asthmatics. She currently resides in St. John's, Newfoundland and Labrador where she is an active performer, session musician, film composer and music educator. She is the first Canadian flutist to be sponsored by Gemeinhardt Musical Instruments.

Music career
Rozalind attended University of Toronto in pursuance of a performance degree in flute, and then on to University of Ottawa to study under Robert Cram towards a Masters Degree in Flute Performance. She has made numerous guest appearances as Mystery Flute Girl with indie artists such as Yo La Tengo, Great Lake Swimmers, Constantines, Lou Barlow and more. During her extensive travels she studied with Robert Dick as an Artist-In-Residence at The Atlantic Center for the Arts in Florida, and a became a long-term resident at the Banff Centre.

Discography
2019: Don't Let Me Fall Too Far
2018: Love and Let Be
2017: Sunset Sunrise
2016: From the River to the Ocean
2014: Head First
2011: Painted Houses
2007: Edgework
2006: Seattle Sessions
2005: Gas Station Sessions
2004: Rozalind & Friends – Live at Cafe Notalgica
2003: Good Kissing School – Lighthousekeepers

References

External links
rozalindmacphail.com
Rozalind MacPhail at CBC Radio 3

Living people
Canadian women singer-songwriters
Canadian flautists
Musicians from St. John's, Newfoundland and Labrador
Musicians from Toronto
Canadian folk singer-songwriters
21st-century Canadian multi-instrumentalists
21st-century Canadian women singers
Year of birth missing (living people)
21st-century flautists